Anentmetus is a genus of beetles in the family Carabidae, containing the following species:

 Anentmetus pluto Andrewes, 1924
 Anentmetus spissicornis (Fairmaire, 1888)

References

Paussinae